Abdarlar (also Romanized as Ābdārlār; also known as Ābdālār) is a village in Charuymaq-e Jonubegharbi Rural District, in the Central District of Charuymaq County, East Azerbaijan Province, Iran. At the 2006 census, its population was 73 with 14 families.

References 

Populated places in Charuymaq County